Kate McLennan  is an Australian comedian, writer and actor. McLennan has performed in Australia and internationally, including at the Edinburgh Festival Fringe. She is known in Australia for her work on television and web series such as The Katering Show, Get Krack!n, and  The Mansion.

Early life
McLennan moved to Geelong at the age of ten and a decade later she moved to Melbourne.

Career
McLennan performed in her first sketch comedy show at the age of 21 at the 2001 Melbourne Fringe, and appeared in the Fringe parade.

She rose to fame writing and performing her solo comedy show The Debutante Diaries, which won her the Best Comedy Award and Best Emerging Artist Award at the Melbourne Fringe Festival in 2006. 

McLennan co-created the web series Bleak with Kate McCartney in 2010, which in won the Kit Denton Disfellowship for Courage and Excellence in Performance Writing at the 2011 AWGIE Awards, worth .

McLennan and McCartney formed their production company called Lead Balloon TV. They wrote, produced and starred as an intolerable foodie (McLennan) and a food intolerant (McCartney) in a cooking-based web series called The Katering Show which screened on their YouTube channel in 2014. A second season of The Katering Show was screened on the  ABC TV and then on ABC iview in 2016.

In 2017, McLennan and McCartney collaborated on an ABC Television comedy called Get Krack!n, playing exaggerated versions of themselves as breakfast show TV hosts, which screened on ABC iview and in the U.S. Get Krack!n ran for two seasons of eight episodes each, with the final episode going to air in April 2019, with Aboriginal actors and writers Miranda Tapsell and Nakkiah Lui given the stage to make strong statements about racism in Australia.

Stand-up comedy tours

Filmography

Awards and nominations

References

External links

Kate McLennan's entertainer biography at Creative Representation

1980 births
Living people
Australian women comedians
Australian stand-up comedians
Australian television personalities
Women television personalities
21st-century Australian comedians